Smail Prevljak (born 10 May 1995) is a Bosnian professional footballer who plays as a forward for Belgian Pro League club Eupen and the Bosnia and Herzegovina national team.

Prevljak started his professional career at RB Leipzig, playing mainly in its reserve team. In 2014, he was loaned to Red Bull Salzburg, who assigned him to Liefering later that year. The following year, he moved to Red Bull Salzburg on permanent basis. Prevljak was sent on loan to Mattersburg in 2017 and to Eupen in 2020. Later that year, he joined Eupen permanently.

A former youth international for Bosnia and Herzegovina, Prevljak made his senior international debut in 2018, earning over 20 caps since.

Club career

Early career
Prevljak started playing football at his hometown club Igman Konjic, before joining youth academy of German team RB Leipzig in 2013. He made his professional debut playing for RB Leipzig II against Fortuna Chemnitz on 24 May 2014 at the age of 19. On 31 May, he scored his first professional goal in a triumph over FC Eilenburg.

Red Bull Salzburg
In August, Prevljak was sent on a season-long loan to Austrian outfit Red Bull Salzburg. He made his official debut for the side on 9 November against Altach.

In June 2015, he moved to Red Bull Salzburg permanently. On 23 August, he scored his first goal for the side against Austria Wien. Prevljak scored his first career hat-trick against FAC on 6 November.

In April 2016, he suffered a severe knee injury, which was diagnosed as anterior cruciate ligament tear and was ruled out for at least six months. He returned to the pitch on 24 February 2017, over ten months after the injury.

In June, Prevljak was loaned to Mattersburg until the end of season.

In June 2018, he signed a new four-year contract with Red Bull Salzburg. On 16 December, he scored four goals in a defeat of St. Pölten. He won his first trophy with the club on 5 May 2019, when they were crowned league champions.

Eupen
In January 2020, Prevljak was sent on a six-month loan to Belgian outfit Eupen. He made his competitive debut for the club against St. Truiden on 8 February and managed to score a goal.

In August, Eupen signed Prevljak on a three-year deal.

He scored his first hat-trick for the team in a victory over Charleroi on 17 April 2021.

International career
Prevljak was a member of Bosnia and Herzegovina under-21 team under coach Darko Nestorović.

In March 2018, he received his first senior call-up, for friendly games against Bulgaria and Senegal. He debuted against the former on 23 March.

On 15 November 2020, in a 2020–21 UEFA Nations League game against the Netherlands, Prevljak scored his first senior international goal.

Personal life
Prevljak married his long-time girlfriend Nejra in March 2017. Together they have a son named Sami.

Career statistics

Club

International

Scores and results list Bosnia and Herzegovina's goal tally first, score column indicates score after each Prevljak goal.

Honours
Red Bull Salzburg
Austrian Bundesliga: 2018–19
Austrian Cup: 2018–19

References

External links

1995 births
Living people
People from Konjic
Bosniaks of Bosnia and Herzegovina
Bosnia and Herzegovina Muslims
Bosnia and Herzegovina footballers
Bosnia and Herzegovina under-21 international footballers
Bosnia and Herzegovina international footballers
Bosnia and Herzegovina expatriate footballers
Association football forwards
RB Leipzig II players
RB Leipzig players
FC Red Bull Salzburg players
FC Liefering players
SV Mattersburg players
K.A.S. Eupen players
2. Bundesliga players
Austrian Football Bundesliga players
2. Liga (Austria) players
Belgian Pro League players
Expatriate footballers in Germany
Expatriate footballers in Austria
Expatriate footballers in Belgium
Bosnia and Herzegovina expatriate sportspeople in Germany
Bosnia and Herzegovina expatriate sportspeople in Austria
Bosnia and Herzegovina expatriate sportspeople in Belgium